Paris Métro Line 1 (French: Ligne 1 du métro de Paris) is one of the sixteen lines of the Paris Métro. It connects La Défense–Grande Arche in the northwest and Château de Vincennes in the southeast. Also, there is a future eastern extension planned to go to Val de Fontenay to make a link with Paris Metro Line 15, RER A, RER E and an extension of Tram 1. Excluding RER commuter lines, it is the busiest line on the network with 181.2 million travellers in 2017 or 496,000 people per day on average.

The line was the network's first to open, with its inaugural section entering service in 1900. It is also the network's first line to be converted from manually driven operation to fully automated operation. Conversion, which commenced in 2007 and was completed in 2011, included new rolling stock (MP 05) and laying of platform edge doors in all stations. The first eight MP 05 trains (501 through 508) went into passenger service on 3 November 2011, allowing the accelerated transfer of the existing MP 89 CC stock to Line 4; however, as of 2019, Line 4 is also being converted to automated operations. The conversion allowed Line 1 to operate as the system's second fully automated line, after Line 14.

A transition to fully automated services was done without major interruption to passenger traffic. The new MP 05 rolling stock was able to operate efficiently alongside the manually-driven MP 89 CC rolling stock until there were enough MP 05 to no longer facilitate the need of the MP 89. Full automation was achieved for evening services in May 2012, with an increase to weekend services by August 2012. As of 15 December 2012, Line 1 is fully automated. The remaining five MP 89 CC trains remained stored on Line 1 near the Fontenay workshops until a new garage for Line 4 was opened south of the new Mairie de Montrouge station in February 2013.

History 
The Parisian metropolitan network has its origins in several decades of debate, more or less bizarre projects and tug of war between the State (which was favourable to the interconnection of large rail networks with large undergrounds) and the City Hall of Paris (which wanted a small-scale network, serving only the inner city with very close stations, effectively prohibiting access to the equipment of the large railway companies). The deterioration of traffic conditions in Paris, the example of foreign capitals and the approach of the 1900 Universal Exhibition convinced the authorities to start construction of the metro. The solution proposed by the Mayor of Paris was finally adopted; the State conceded the design and construction of the work to the City of Paris. After the adoption by the municipal council on 20 April 1896 of the network project of Fulgence Bienvenüe and Edmond Huet, the "metropolitan railway" was declared a public utility by a law that became effective 30 March 1898.

In November 1898, the City of Paris decided to undertake preliminary work of the metro network with the construction of the first line of the Parisian subway system. Work lasted twenty months under the leadership of engineers Fulgence Bienvenüe and was financed by the municipality of Paris. The line was divided into eight parts distributed among several companies. On 19 July 1900, the line was opened between Porte Maillot and Porte de Vincennes to connect the various sites of the World Fair. Only eight stations were finalised and opened with the inauguration; ten more were gradually opened between 6 August and 1 September 1900. The line followed the east–west monument axis in Paris. These eighteen stations were entirely built under the control of engineer Fulgence Bienvenüe, the majority of them 75 metres long and 4.10 metres wide. In March 1934, the first extension into the suburbs brought service to Château of Vincennes towards the east.

Chronology 
 20 April 1896: the Paris City Council adopts the Fulgence Bienvenüe network project.
 30 March 1898: declaration of public utility of the first six lines of the "metropolitan railway".
 4 October 1898: launch of works of Line 1.
 19 July 1900: Inauguration of Line 1 between Porte de Vincennes and Porte Maillot. Only 8 of the 18 planned stations were opened.
 6 August and 1 September 1900: The other 10 stations of the line opened.
 24 March 1934: The line was extended to the east from Porte de Vincennes to the castle of Vincennes.
 15 November 1936: Porte Maillot station was rebuilt in order to allow a further extension of the line to the west.
 29 April 1937: The line was extended to the west from Porte Maillot to Pont de Neuilly.
 1963: The rails were converted in order to accommodate rubber-tyred trains (the MP 59). At the same time, stations were enlarged in order to accommodate 6-car trains instead of 5-car trains.
 1 April 1992: The line was extended again to the west from Pont de Neuilly to La Défense business district.
 1997: MP 89 CC rolling stock was introduced, replacing the older MP 59 stock.
 2007: Automation project commenced.
 3 November 2011: Cascading of MP 89CC to MP 05 stock began, as the automation project (construction) was completed.
 May 2012: Full automation is achieved for evening services.
 July 2012: Full automation is achieved for weekend services.
 15 December 2012: Full automation reaches 100% status, allowing the MP 89CC to no longer be needed on Line 1.

Rolling stock 
Line 1 has had five different types of rolling stock throughout the years:
M1 (Westinghouse): 1900–1921
Sprague-Thomson: 1913–1964
MP 59: 1963–1998
MP 89CC: 1997–2012
MP 05: 2011–present

Automation 
After successfully opening Line 14 as a fully automated line, the RATP began to explore the possibility of automating existing lines on the system. The agency first focused on Line 1, since it is the busiest of all of the Paris subway lines, and also the line most frequented by tourists. Automation not only allowed Paris to remain as a model for technological innovations in the railway industry but also increases the number of lines in normal service when RATP workers are striking (MP 05 rolling stock). This was shown when the transport union engaged in industrial action in September 2019 without affecting service on Line 1.

Work began in 2007 and was largely carried out without interrupting passenger traffic. Preliminary work involved electrical and signaling upgrades throughout the entire line. Work also commenced on converting the original Porte Maillot station (also known as "Espace Maillot") into a light maintenance facility for the MP 05 rolling stock. In 2009, work commenced on installing platform screen doors; with Bérault and Porte Maillot being the first stations to be equipped. Due to its curved platform, Bastille (in 2011) was among the last stations to be equipped. During this time, individual stations were intermittently closed to allow platforms to be leveled with the height of the train floors (from :fr:Ligne 1 du métro de Paris).

Although most of the stations remain the same as they were prior to automation (with the exception of the platform screen doors), many stations like St. Paul, received brand new signage. Franklin D. Roosevelt received a complete overhaul from its post World War II facade to a more contemporary & modern look.

On 3 November 2011, the first eight trains of the new MP 05 rolling stock were put into service on Line 1. These trains ran alongside the MP 89 CC rolling stock until enough automated stock was available for passenger service. This cascading was achieved thanks to the SAET system, which is the first version of Siemens Transportation Systems' Trainguard MT CBTC. The arrival of the new stock allowed the RATP to accelerate transfer of the MP 89 from Line 1 to Line 4 at a rate of about 2 to 3 trains per month between November 2011 and November 2012. That rate increased to 4 trains per month during November and December 2012.

Major milestones were reached in May and July 2012 as full automation reached sufficient levels by which the MP 89 were no longer needed during late evenings and weekends respectively. For the Nuit Blanche during October 2012, Line 1 also operated in full automation. The final milestone was reached on 15 December 2012, as full automation of Line 1 approached 100%, allowing the remaining MP 89 trains to be pulled from regular service on 21 December 2012. Due to insufficient storage space on Line 4, the remaining 6 to 7 MP 89 trains remained stored on the Line 1 tracks near Fontenay until a new garage in the Montrouge area opened. That opening was tentatively set for February/March 2013 and will coincide with the opening of the new Mairie de Montrouge station opening on Line 4.

Future
A western extension of Line 1 from La Défense station to the center of Nanterre is being considered. Another proposal being investigated would have a new station constructed at Fontenay – Rigollots, just before the line climbs to the surface to enter Fontenay shops, and then continue eastward to Val de Fontenay to connect with RER lines A and E.

Map and stations
This line has 25 stations.

Renamed stations

* The Louvre station renamings were made after the entrance to the museum was moved following construction of the Louvre Pyramid.

Tourism 
Line 1 passes near several places of interest:
 La Défense high-rise business district, where the most prominent landmark is the Grande Arche. The La Défense Arena, home of the Racing 92 rugby union club and host venue for the 2024 Summer Olympics, is nearby.
 The Arc de Triomphe at Charles de Gaulle-Étoile. A 289 step staircase is open to the public and leads to the top of the Arch. There is also a museum on the top floor.
 The Avenue des Champs-Élysées, a famous shopping street.
 The Place de la Concorde, dominated by the Obelisk, Tuileries Garden and Louvre.
 Louvre station has replicas of works of art from the museum and has historical information. The station's benches are made of glass and the Western portal has Roman-inspired arches along the platform edge.
 The Hôtel de Ville (Paris City Hall) and the Marais district.
 Bastille and the nearby Opera.
 Gare de Lyon train station.
 The Place de la Nation.
 The Bois de Vincennes (Vincennes Wood) and Paris Zoological Park (Vincennes Zoo).
 The Château de Vincennes. A medieval castle to the east of Paris.

Gallery

See also

References

External links 

  RATP official website
  RATP english speaking website
  Interactive Map of the RER (from RATP's website)
  Interactive Map of the Paris métro (from RATP's website)
  Metro-Pole website, dedicated to Paris public transports (unofficial)

Articles containing video clips
Rubber-tyred metros
Railway lines opened in 1900